Picnic – A Breath of Fresh Air is a sampler issued by the Harvest Records label, originally released in 1970 and notable for including the previously unreleased Pink Floyd song, "Embryo".

The similarly-entitled A Breath of Fresh Air – A Harvest Records Anthology 1969–1974 released on 14 May 2007 borrowed most of the original title, but had only three tracks in common with its precursor (Pink Floyd's "Embryo", Panama Limited's "Round and Round", and Quatermass' "Black Sheep of the Family"). Although most tracks featured were of similar vintage, the album was a retrospective compilation, rather than a promotional sampler.

History
EMI Records launched the  Harvest label in 1969 to take advantage of the progressive rock market, and like many record labels at the time, they produced a budget-priced showcase album of their artists.  Their roster of artists was large and interesting enough to support a double album retailing at 29s/11d (approximately £1.50). The result was an eclectic mixture of traditional folk, hard rock, psychedelia and obscurities.

The inclusion of "Embryo", without the approval of Pink Floyd, and which the band considered unfinished, resulted in the album's prompt withdrawal.  Some editions do not credit the track to Pink Floyd on the inside cover.

1970 release track listing

2007 release track listing

Disc one
 "Evil" – Edgar Broughton Band
 "Listen Learn Read On" – Deep Purple (from The Book of Taliesyn 1968)
 "Druid One" – Third Ear Band
 "Station Song" – Pete Brown and His Battered Ornaments
 "Rainmaker" – Michael Chapman
 "Singing A Song In The Morning" – Kevin Ayers
 "A Forsaking: Our Captain Cried" – Shirley and Dolly Collins
 "Careful with That Axe, Eugene" – Pink Floyd (single b-side)
 "Armchair Theatre" – Tea and Symphony
 "Big Bear Ffolly" – Bakerloo
 "Round And Round" – Panama Ltd. Jug Band
 "Octopus" – Syd Barrett (from The Madcap Laughs 1970)
 "Painter" – Deep Purple
 "Country Morning" – Pete Brown & Piblokto!
 "Francesca" – Roy Harper
 "Bad Penny" – Forest
 "Backwood" – Chris Spedding
 "Real Cool World" – Greatest Show On Earth
 "Breathe" – Roger Waters and Ron Geesin (from Music from The Body 1970)
 "Taking Some Time On " – Barclay James Harvest

Disc two
 "There's No Vibrations But Wait" – Edgar Broughton Band
 "Soulful Lady" – Michael Chapman
 "Entropy" – Quatermass
 "Black Sheep Of The Family" – Quatermass
 "Grass" – The Pretty Things
 "Salisbury Plain" – Shirley & Dolly Collins
 "Embryo" – Pink Floyd
 "Shouldn't Have Took More Than You Gave" – Dave Mason
 "Speed King" – Deep Purple
 "Magic Woman Touch" – Greatest Show On Earth
 "Aeroplane Head Woman" – Pete Brown & Piblokto!
 "Baby Lemonade" – Syd Barrett
 "Don't You Grieve" – Roy Harper
 "October 26" – The Pretty Things
 "Song from the Bottom of a Well" – Kevin Ayers
 "First Leaf of Autumn" – Michael Chapman
 "Call Me a Liar" – Edgar Broughton Band

Disc three
 "She Said" – Barclay James Harvest
 "South Africa" – Roy Harper
 "Evening Over Rooftops" – Edgar Broughton Band
 "Do Ya" – The Move
 "When the City Sleeps" – Bombadil
 "Lady Rachel" – Kevin Ayers (from Joy of a Toy 1969)
 "10538 Overture" – Electric Light Orchestra
 "The City (Part Three)" – Mark-Almond
 "Spaceship" – Spontaneous Combustion
 "Macbeth" – Third Ear Band
 "Fresh Air" – Jan Akkerman
 "Twelve Hours Of Sunset" – Roy Harper
 "Wells Fargo" – Babe Ruth
 "Showdown" – Electric Light Orchestra
 "Jet Silver and the Dolls of Venus" – Be-Bop Deluxe

Album cover

None of the artists who were featured on the album are portrayed on the outer cover. The front and rear of the gatefold show a group of people wearing World War II gas masks sitting in sand dunes with a dead bird on the sand. The interior of the sleeve displays the covers of most of the albums from which the tracks are taken against the background of an incoming sea tide. This background features a family walking across the sands in a washed-out monochrome. The cover design and photographs are credited to Hipgnosis, famous for their progressive rock album cover designs.

References

External links 
 An appreciation of Picnic - A Breath Of Fresh Air by Dave Sanderson (2006)

1970 compilation albums
Albums with cover art by Hipgnosis
Folk rock compilation albums
Progressive rock compilation albums
Harvest Records compilation albums
Record label compilation albums
Albums recorded at IBC Studios